Secret Room is a 2013 Nigerian direct-to-video thriller film directed by Eneaji Chris Eneng and starring OC Ukeje, Jide Kosoko, Linda Ejiofor and Lilian Esoro.

Cast
O. C. Ukeje	as Kingsley Ojei
Jide Kosoko	as Ambassador John Furiye
Lilian Esoro	as Edna Ojei
Linda Ejiofor	as Ada Obika

See also
 List of Nigerian films of 2013

References

2012 films
English-language Nigerian films
2010s thriller films
2012 direct-to-video films
Nigerian thriller films
2010s English-language films